The 2020 Duhallow Junior A Football Championship is the 88th staging of the Duhallow Junior A Football Championship. The draw for the group stage placings took place on 19 November 2019. The championship was scheduled to begin in April 2020, however, it was postponed indefinitely due to the coronavirus pandemic in Ireland. The championship is scheduled to take place between July and October 2020.

Boherbue were the defending champions and retained their title after beating Cullen.

Teams 
The following Clubs competed for the 2020 Duhallow Junior A Football Championship

Group stage

Group 1 

Round 1Round 2

Round 3

Group 2 

Round 1Round 2Round 3

Final 
Duhallow Winners will Qualify to the First Round of the 2020 Cork Junior A Football Championship.

2020 Cork Junior A Football Championship

Boherbue 
Quarter-finalsSemi-finalsFinal

See also 
 Duhallow GAA
 Duhallow Junior A Football Championship

References

External links 
 http://duhallowgaacork.com
 https://gaacork.ie/county-championship-draw-2020/

2020 in Gaelic football
Gaelic football competitions in County Cork